This is a list of artists who have won a Dove Award by the Gospel Music Association. The award was known as the GMA Music Award from 2004 to 2006.

#
 2nd Chapter of Acts
 4Him

A
 Addison Road
 Jimmy Abegg
 Yolanda Adams
 The Afters
 Carolyn Arends
 Audio Adrenaline
 Avalon

B
 Rob Beckley
 The Blackwood Brothers
 Bleach
 The Blind Boys of Alabama
 Blue Highway
 Brown Bannister
 Building 429
 Burlap to Cashmere
 Bride
 By the Tree
 Marc Byrd

C
 Candle
 Caedmon's Call
 Shirley Caesar
 Jeremy Camp
 Johnny Cash
 Ed Cash
 Casting Crowns
 Gary Chapman
 Steven Curtis Chapman
 The Choir
 Charlotte Church
 John Cooper
 The Crabb Family
 Andraé Crouch

D
 David Crowder Band
 Day of Fire
 dc Talk
 DecembeRadio
 Brian Doerksen
 Downhere
 Phil Driscoll

E
 East West
 Emilio Estefan
 Lester Estelle II
 Sara Evans

F
 FFH
 First Call
 Kirk Franklin

G
 GRITS
 Gaither Vocal Band
 Bill Gaither
 God's Property
 Amy Grant
 Natalie Grant

H
 Fred Hammond
 Noah Henson
 Annie Herring
 Kathie Hill
 Kim Hill
 Steve Hindalong
 Mark Hoppus
 Whitney Houston
 Tim Hughes

I
 The Imperials

J
 Jars of Clay
Jeremy Camp

K
 Phil Keaggy
 Mat Kearney
 Alex Kendrick
 Stephen Kendrick
 Wes King
 The Kingsmen
 Jennifer Knapp

L
 Rachael Lampa
 Lauryn Hill
 Leonardo
 Crystal Lewis
 Brian Littrell

M
 The Martins
 Mary Mary
 Kevin Max
 TobyMac
 MercyMe
Michelle Grigg
 Dave Meyers
 Mississippi Mass Choir
 Don Moen
 Dave Moody
 Geoff Moore
 Nicole C. Mullen
 Rich Mullins
 Mutemath
 MxPx
 Mitch McVicker

N
 Michael Neale
 Newsboys
 NF
 Nichole Nordeman
 Smokie Norful
 Bebo Norman
 Natalie Grant

O
 The Oak Ridge Boys
 The Old Friends Quartet
 Stacie Orrico
 Fernando Ortega
 Out of Eden

P
 P.O.D.
 Brad Paisley
 Twila Paris
 Sandi Patty
 Paul Colman Trio
 Paul Meany
 Charlie Peacock
 Jill Phillips
 Pillar
 Point of Grace
 Mac Powell
 PraiseStreet Worship Band

R
 Rachel, Rachel
 Matt Redman
 Relient K
 Chris Rice

S
 Stellar Kart
 Sanctus Real
 Selah
 Sixpence None the Richer
 Michael W. Smith
 Souljahz
 Rebecca St. James
 Scott Stapp
 Pete Stewart
 Angie Stone
 Switchfoot

T
 The Talleys
 tobyMac
 T-bone
 Russ Taff
 Michael Tait
 Take 6
 Tedd T
 Third Day
 Chris Tomlin
 Randy Travis
 Kathy Troccoli

U
 Carrie Underwood

V
 VeggieTales
 Jaci Velasquez
 Phil Vischer
Virtue

W
 Matthew Ward
 Wayne Watson
 Gregg Wattenberg
 Whitecross
 BeBe Winans
 CeCe Winans
 World Wide Message Tribe
 Paul Wright

Z
 ZOEgirl

References

Complete list of all winners from 1969 to present, Retrieved April 3, 2007
1998 Dove Award winners, Retrieved April 3, 2007
2000 Awards, Retrieved April 3, 2007

Winners
Dove